Chilliwack Central Elementary Community is a public elementary school in Chilliwack, British Columbia part of School District 33 Chilliwack.

History  

Chilliwack Central is considered to be the original school within the Chilliwack School District with the first school house opening in 1871. The school location was first moved to the Chilliwack River in 1874, then new buildings were erected in 1907 and 1911 where the Southgate Shopping Centre now exists. In 1929, the present Central School was erected on Young Street North with eighteen rooms. The first Principal of Central was Harold Manuel. (1929-1950)

In 2007, Principal Clyde Dougans was named one of Canada's Outstanding Principals.

Administration  

Bob Beckett, Scott Wallace and Jim Edgcombe are the only admin to serve as both VP and Principal. Noel Sharman is the only former student of Central who has served as an administrator. Nadine Clattenburg was the first female to serve as Principal in 2011-12.

Programs 

Gateway For Families/Community School Coordinator
Central has a full-time Gateway For Families/Community School Coordinator. Work includes overseeing the day-to-day operations of programs and activities governed by the CCECSS.  The coordinator recruits, promotes, and provides year around site supervision for contracted programs/user groups.  Her focus is on developing a working relationship with public and private agencies to recruit and coordinate services that empower the Central community children and their families. Additionally, the Coordinator oversees all aspects of 2nd Day and  Gateway for Families. The position is governed by the CCECSS, the coordinator works in consultation with the principal. The responsibilities of the coordinator are determined by the Society in consultation with the principal (or designate) and in accordance with the Joint Use Agreement between School District 33 and the City of Chilliwack.

The coordinator's major responsibilities include:
Program Development /Delivery/Facility Management
Staff and Volunteer Management
Community Liaison/Partnerships/Public Relations/Grantsmanship
Policy Development
Fundraising/Special Events Coordination
Budget Developing/Monitoring/Payroll
Second Day Development/Delivery/Management

Central has been identified as a community hub called "Gateway for Families" which hosts Community Partner programming that respectfully engages inner core community members from all age, ethnic, and socio-economic realms in opportunities that promote health and independence in their lives. These supports are delivered mainly during the school day through the collaboration of community agencies that provide services to children and their families within the Chilliwack Downtown Community.
Ministry of Children and Family Development continues to support the concept of neighborhood hubs by funding a family resource room & office space for the use of MCFD workers & community partners.
Licensed infant/toddler daycare and preschool available for parents attending ongoing programs. Central Gateway Preschool also available to general public 3 mornings and 5 afternoons a week.
Families First offers a support group to parents or caregivers of children ages 0–12 with the challenges of parenting.
Family Literacy provides UFV upgrading, virtues parenting program, goal setting and life skills support & learning opportunities.
Families In Motion view families as a learning unit, and provide support and learning opportunities for all family members.
Education and Career Planning an upgrading course offered through the University of the Fraser Valley.
Next Step provides intensive services to children with autism offered by Fraser Valley Child Development Centre.
Chilliwack Learning Community Society provides outreach workers to tutor one on one to improve adult literacy skills.
Sto:lo Nation  and  Aboriginal Child & Youth  Mental Health provide culturally appropriate support services to children and their families.
Success by 6 works with parents and communities so children 0-6 can be healthy, safe, secure, socially engaged, responsible and successful learners.

References 

Elementary schools in British Columbia
Education in Chilliwack